Thomas or Tom O'Halloran may refer to:

Tom O'Halloran (footballer) (1892–1970), Australian rules (VFL) footballer with South Melbourne
Tom O'Halloran (climber) (born 1992), Australian climber
Thomas O'Halloran (footballer) (1904–1956) Australian rules (VFL) footballer playing for Richmond
Thomas Shuldham O'Halloran (1797–1870), South Australian police commissioner
T. J. S. O'Halloran (1835–1922), his son, magistrate and minor football identity
Thomas Shuldham O'Halloran (lawyer) (1865–1945), his grandson, SAFL football official

See also 
Tom O'Halleran (born 1946), American politician